Catrina Nicole Frierson (born August 23, 1979) is an American former professional basketball player and coach. She won a Women's National Basketball Association (WNBA) championship with the Seattle Storm in 2004.

Frierson is a native of Vicksburg, Mississippi, and attended Vicksburg High School. She played college basketball for the Louisiana Tech Lady Techsters from 1999 to 2004 and was a two-time first-team All-Western Athletic Conference (WAC) selection. Frierson missed the entirety of the 2000–01 season after she tore ligaments in her knee. She averaged a career-best 16.2 points per game during her senior season.

Frierson was selected by the Seattle Storm as the 19th overall pick of the 2004 WNBA draft. She received limited playing time as a result of knee injuries and only played in five games for the Storm as they went on to win the WNBA championship in her rookie season. Frierson was waived by the Storm during training camp before the 2005 WNBA season.

Frierson joined the Northwestern State Lady Demons as an assistant coach on August 24, 2005. She ended her stint with the Lady Demons in 2011 and returned to Vicksburg, where she conducts basketball training sessions and camps.

Louisiana Tech statistics

Source

Notes

References

External links

1979 births
Living people
American women's basketball coaches
American women's basketball players
Basketball coaches from Mississippi
Basketball players from Mississippi
Forwards (basketball)
Seattle Storm draft picks
Seattle Storm players
Sportspeople from Vicksburg, Mississippi
21st-century American women